Teh Cheang Wan (3 March 1928 – 14 December 1986) was a Singaporean architect and politician who was a member of the governing People's Action Party. He was in charge of the Housing Development Board as Minister for National Development of Singapore. He served as the Member of the Singapore Parliament for Geylang West SMC on 31 January 1979 to 14 December 1986. Teh was investigated for corruption in November 1986 and was found dead on 14 December 1986 due to suicide.

Early life
Teh's early education began at Lai Teck School and later at Chung Ling High School, Penang. He studied architecture at the University of Sydney in Australia, graduating in 1956.

Teh's early career was as an architect at PWD, New South Wales, Australia. He then moved to the Housing Commission in New South Wales before expanding his expertise with the Housing Trust in Kuala Lumpur and serving in the Penang City Council. In August 1959, he joined the Singapore Improvement Trust as an architect. He was promoted to chief architect, Building Department of the newly formed Housing and Development Board (HDB) in October 1959. Later he became the chief executive officer of HDB from 1970 to January 1979. He was also the chairman of Jurong Town Corporation between September 1976 to March 1979. He resigned from his posts to go into politics.

Teh was elected as a Member of Parliament for Geylang West constituency in January 1979, and held the seat till December 1986. He was also appointed as the Minister for National Development on 1 February 1979 and held his position.

As Minister for National Development, Teh proposed a ban on chewing gum in 1983 in light of public cleanliness issues. Then-Prime Minister Lee Kuan Yew rejected the idea as being too drastic, but 9 years after Teh's initial proposal, a chewing gum ban was passed into law.

Corruption charges

Teh was investigated for corruption by the Corrupt Practices Investigation Bureau for accepting two bribes of $400,000 each in 1981 and 1982. Then Minister for National Development, he had allegedly accepted bribes totaling $1 million from 2 private companies for helping them retain and buy over a piece of state land for private development.

In November 1986, the former Prime Minister of Singapore, Lee Kuan Yew, approved an open investigation on his alleged corruption; however, the papers were issued to the Attorney-General on December 11. Though Teh maintained his innocence, he committed suicide before being charged for the offences, on December 14.

In his suicide note, Teh wrote:

As a result of the suicide, the Attorney-General could not proceed with the charges, although Lee Kuan Yew responded with a condolence letter after ascertaining the cause of his death with Ministry of Health. The letter recognized his role to help modernize the construction industry and speed up the building of expressways and lessen traffic jams.

On 26 Jan 1987, Lee Kuan Yew delivered a parliamentary speech by reading out the suicide note addressed to him, written by Teh. He then revealed for the first time that Teh was being investigated for accepting bribes. Lee stressed that "there is no way a Minister can avoid investigations, and a trial if there is evidence to support one." Later in the book titled "Lee Kuan Yew: The Man and His Ideas", published in 1998, Lee reiterated the importance of having a system where people act in accordance with certain principles. "The purpose is not just to be righteous. The purpose is to create a system which will carry on because it has not been compromised. I didn't do that just to be righteous about Teh Cheang Wan. But if I had compromised, that is the end of the system."However, there was a subsequent investigation into the matter as a result of allegation of Chiam See Tong, the opposition MP, that there were unanswered questions into the whole episode. On 20 January 1987, the State Coroner returned a verdict of suicide due to an overdose of amytal barbiturate. In December 1987, the findings of the Commission of Inquiry were presented to the President of Singapore, however, they were not released to the public till the end the year. The entire probe lasted 31 months.

Award
1976 : Meritorious Service Medal

References

 Singapore Infopedia Teh Cheang Wan, updated 2002.

1928 births
1986 deaths
Chinese emigrants to Singapore
People's Action Party politicians
Members of the Parliament of Singapore
Members of the Cabinet of Singapore
Drug-related suicides